Friedrich Suda (born 11 June 1939) is an Austrian former backstroke swimmer. He competed at the 1960 Summer Olympics and the 1964 Summer Olympics.

References

External links
 

1939 births
Living people
Austrian male backstroke swimmers
Olympic swimmers of Austria
Swimmers at the 1960 Summer Olympics
Swimmers at the 1964 Summer Olympics
Swimmers from Vienna